Kenneth Lin or Ken Lin may refer to:

Kenneth Lin (playwright), playwright and screenwriter
Kenneth Lin (entrepreneur), founder and CEO of Credit Karma